Kidbits is a mini-album by popular children's entertainers Sharon, Lois & Bram, originally released in 1992. The album was released to promote their other 1992 album, Great Big Hits. The album featured eleven of Sharon, Lois & Brams previously recorded songs. The first song, Skinnamarink Introduction features the 1986 version of Skinnamarink with a voice-over introduction by Sharon, Lois & Bram. 

Kidbits was only released on cassette. The inside foldout contains information about Great Big Hits and their 1992 video titled Sharon, Lois & Bram: Sing A to Z. It also features a clip-out coupon.

Track listing
"Skinnamarink Introduction"
"Cookie Jar"
"She'll Be Coming Round the Mountain"
"Hush, Little Baby"
"Ha-Ha, This-A-Way"
"Rig-A-Jig-Jig"
"Oh Dear, What Can the Matter Be?"
"Michaud"
"Jump Josie"
"Happy Birthday Waltz"
"I Had A Little Doll"

Songs 1 & 6 from: Sharon, Lois & Bram's Elephant Show Record
Songs 2,3, & 8 from: One Elephant, Deux Éléphants
Song 4 from: Sing A to Z
Songs 5,7,9 & 11 from: Mainly Mother Goose
Song 10 from: Happy Birthday

Sharon, Lois & Bram albums
1992 compilation albums